Joshua Peter De Souza (born 12 November 1988) is an Indian politician residing in Mapusa, Goa, and was elected to the Goa Legislative Assembly in the by-election in 2019 as a member of the Bharatiya Janata Party. On 22nd July 2022 he was elected as the Deputy Speaker of Goa Legislative Assembly with a majority of 24-12 votes against Siolim Congress MLA Delilah Lobo.

Currently, he is the Member of the Legislative Assembly of Mapusa Constituency, National General Secretary of Bharatiya Janta Party Minority Morcha, the Vice Chairman of Goa State Infrastructure Development Corporation (GSIDC) and the Chairman of Mormugao Planning and Development Authority (MPDA). Besides that, he is also a social worker and entrepreneur.

Family background 
D'Souza is the son of former Deputy Chief Minister of Goa Adv. Francis D'Souza who previously served the people of Mapusa as a Councillor (1985-2000), Mayor (1998-2000), and Member of the Legislative Assembly(1999-2019). His humility, fondness, and love for his people has been a source of inspiration for Joshua from a very young age. Having been born into a political family, Joshua had the opportunity to work closely with his father and learn from the best. Spending time with his father ultimately drew him toward his community.  Francis D'Souza died on 14 February 2019 at the age of 64, following a battle with Cancer. After his death, Joshua decided to contest his first By-election in 2019. Joshua won the 2019 by-election and was elected as the MLA of Mapusa Assembly constituency. Ever since, he has served the people of Mapusa with hard work and dedication. BJP gives Joshua Mapusa bypoll ticket, no surprises elsewhere

Posts held
•	2015 – 2019: Councillor Ward No. 13, Mapusa Municipal Council•	2019 – Present: MLA, Mapusa Constituency. •	2021 – Present: Vice Chairman of Goa State Infrastructure Development Corporation (GSIDC)•	2021 – Present: National General Secretary of the BJP Minority Morcha.•	2022 – Present: Chairman of Mormugao Planning and Development Authority (MPDA)•2022 - Present: Deputy Speaker of Goa Legislative Assembly.<p>

References

1988 births
Living people
Goa MLAs 2022–2027
Bharatiya Janata Party politicians from Goa
People from Mapusa
Goa MLAs 2017–2022
Indian Roman Catholics